Crossett Experimental Forest is an experimental forest operated by the Southern Research Station (SRS) of the United States Forest Service in Ashley County, Arkansas.

Description

The forest contains  that were given to the U.S. Forest Service by the Crossett Lumber Company (later merged into Georgia-Pacific) in 1934.  The tract is used for research into forestry management practices principally involving Pinus taeda and P. echinata.  It includes one area, the  Reynolds Natural Area that has received little human intervention since the forest was established.  The remainder of the land is managed according to a variety of practices seeking to maximize timber yields.

History
The virgin forests of northern Louisiana and southern Arkansas were virtually depleted by 1930 due to lumbering activities over the preceding forty years.  During this time, little regard was given to sustainable forestry practices, and the land that was logged was usually sold off for agricultural uses.  With the prospect of complete collapse of its logging activities, the Crossett Lumber Company decided to donate this parcel to the United States Forest Service as a research station.  Under the agreement, the Forest Service was committed to return to the company an amount of lumber equal to what it had at the time of the donation.  Land for the research forest was selected in 1933, and by the end of that year, CCC crews began work on facilities in the selected parcels.  This work included roads, office facilities, and research and equipment buildings.  CCC crews were also used to inventory the forest's timber assets in detail.

Three buildings constructed by the CCC in 1939 and 1940 have survived, and are now listed on the National Register of Historic Places (NRHP).  Located at the main complex off Arkansas Highway 133, these are Building #2 – a garage and storage facility, Building #6 – an office building/shop, and Building #8 – a residence.

The experimental forest is administratively affiliated with the Ouachita National Forest through the Jessieville and Winona Ranger District.

NRHP gallery

References

External links

Research forests
Protected areas of Ashley County, Arkansas
Ouachita National Forest
Buildings and structures on the National Register of Historic Places in Arkansas
National Register of Historic Places in Ashley County, Arkansas
1934 establishments in Arkansas